The Atlanta Exposition Centers (AEC) are a pair of convention centers located in Atlanta. The centers are located at 3650 and 3850 Jonesboro Road, at the intersection of Jonesboro Road and Interstate 285.

The centers host a number of events, including antique markets, dog shows, and the Atlanta Build, Remodel & Landscape Expo.

References

External links
Atlanta Exposition Centers website

Buildings and structures in Atlanta
Convention centers in Georgia (U.S. state)
Tourist attractions in Atlanta